Felipe Santiago Benítez Ávalos (May 1, 1926 – March 19, 2009) was the Paraguayan Catholic Archbishop of the Archdiocese of Asuncion from his appointment on May 20, 1989, until his retirement on June 12, 2002.

Benítez Avalos was born in Piribebuy on May 1, 1926, to parents Angel del Rosario Benítez García and Juana Avalos Rodríguez.

He remained the Archbishop Emeritus until his death at the Hospital Universitario in Asunción on March 19, 2009, at the age of 82.

References

External links 
 Catholic Hierarchy: Archbishop Felipe Santiago Benitez Avalos † 

1926 births
2009 deaths
People from Piribebuy
Paraguayan people of Andalusian descent
Paraguayan Roman Catholic archbishops
Roman Catholic bishops of Villarrica del Espíritu Santo
Roman Catholic archbishops of Asunción
Participants in the Second Vatican Council
20th-century Roman Catholic archbishops in Paraguay
21st-century Roman Catholic archbishops in Paraguay